Frank Lucas (1930–2019) was an American drug dealer.

Frank Lucas may also refer to:

Frank Lucas (cricketer) (1888-1941), Australian cricketer
Frank Lucas (Oklahoma politician) (born 1960), American legislator
Frank Lucas (Wyoming politician) (1876–1948), American governor
F. L. Lucas (Frank Laurence Lucas, 1894–1967), English literary critic
J. Frank Lucas, American actor in 1964's The Curse of the Living Corpse
Frankie Lucas (born 1953), Vincentian boxer, English champion 1972–73
Frank Lucas, American character in A-Haunting We Will Go

See also 
"Mr. Frank Lucas", track 17 on 2009 album Draped Up and Chipped Out, Vol. 4
Francis Lucas (disambiguation)
Lucas (surname)